Hello Operator may refer to:

"Hello Operator" (song), a song by the White Stripes
"Miss Susie had a steamboat", a children's song also known as "Hello Operator".